Elections to Amber Valley Borough Council were held on 10 June 2004.  One third of the council was up for election and the Conservative Party held overall control of the council.  Overall turnout was 44%.

After the election, the composition of the council was:
Conservative 24
Labour 21

Election result

Ward results

External links
BBC report of 2004 Amber Valley election result

2004
2004 English local elections
2000s in Derbyshire